Eugene Henry DeBruin (April 1, 1933 – c. 1968) was a U.S. Air Force staff sergeant, and a member of Air America serving in Laos during the Second Indochina War. DeBruin was working as a "kicker" for Air America in 1963 when his C-46 was shot down. He was a POW at a Pathet Lao prison camp in Laos until he and other prisoners attempted to escape. After this, there is little known about DeBruin's whereabouts.

Biography

Early life and military career
Eugene DeBruin was born April 1, 1933, in Kaukauna, Wisconsin. He was the second eldest of ten children that grew up in a Wisconsin farm. While growing up, DeBruin became interested in outdoor activities such as hunting, fishing and skiing.

After graduating from high school, DeBruin joined the U.S. Air Force in 1952. He served four years, mostly in Japan, as an aircraft mechanic reaching the rank of Staff sergeant. During that time, he also obtained a private pilot license. He practiced judo during his time in Japan.

After being discharged from the Air Force, DeBruin enrolled at the University of Montana at Missoula, Montana, obtaining a bachelor's degree in forestry. He then worked as a "Smokejumper" for three years in Alaska. DeBruin then moved to Mexico to learn Spanish with the intent of becoming a writer.

After declining to join the Peace Corps, DeBruin volunteered as a "kicker" with Air America. His job was to kick the pallets of rice and other food out of an airplane to aid Lao refugees. According to his brother, he had plans of joining the Peace Corps after he finished his stint with Air America.

Capture and first escape attempt
On September 5, 1963, during one of his flights over Laos, DeBruin's C-46 cargo airliner was shot down by ground fire. He took off on a mission with fellow Americans, Joseph C. Cheney II and Charles G. Herrick, Thai Pisidhi Indradat, Prasit Promsuwan and Prasit Thanee, and Chinese To Yick Chiu. He crashed about 2 kilometers from Tchepone in Savannakhet Province. DeBruin, To, and the three Thai nationals parachuted to safety, but were immediately captured by the Pathet Lao. Cheney and Herrick were killed in the crash.

After his capture, DeBruin was moved to four different prisons, together with the other four prisoners. In May 1964, they managed to escape for three days, but were caught at a watering hole.

Second escape attempt
After that failed attempt, DeBruin attempted a second escape. The other six prisoners who worked together for this second attempt were:
Pisidhi Indradat (Thai)
Prasit Promsuwan (Thai)
Prasit Thanee (Thai)
To Yick Chiu (Chinese)
Duane W. Martin (American)
Dieter Dengler (American)

Dengler was the last to arrive at the POW camp, and was initially mistrusted by the other prisoners as they thought he might be an informant. Eventually the prisoners advised Dengler of their past escape attempts.

On June 29, 1966, while the guards were eating, the group slipped out of their hand and foot restraints and grabbed the guards' unattended submachine guns. The Pathet Lao guards spotted some of the other prisoners trying to escape. A shootout between the two sides ensued and Dengler and Indradat ended up killing five guards so the others could escape. Two others ran off, presumably to get help. The seven prisoners split into three groups: Indradat, and the other Thai prisoners; DeBruin stayed with To, who had been too ill to continue with the escape; and Dengler and Martin headed for the Mekong River to escape to Thailand. Martin was killed by a Laotian villager, while Dengler was rescued after 23 days in the jungle. Indradat was also rescued later.

Later life
Of the seven prisoners that attempted to escape, only two reached safety (Dengler and Indradat). One report stated that DeBruin was killed in the escape attempt, but Indradat originally reported that he last saw DeBruin attempting to "reach high ground in a classified location".

In March 1971, the Central Intelligence Agency had reconnaissance Team Papaya/305 operating in the area of DeBruin's capture. Tasked with gathering military intelligence concerning DeBruin, it returned a report that the CIA's case handler thought truthful:

Eugene Henry DeBruin arrived at Muong Phine (XD 0927) in late 1966. On or about 3 January 1967 DeBruin was taken from Muong Phine and arrived at Muong Nong (XD 6010) on or about 5 January 1967. The Muong Nong prison contained only eight other Americans at this time. While in Muong Nong, DeBruin was strictly guarded by the North Vietnamese Army and he suffered very much. The North Vietnamese Army did not torture him but kept him imprisoned and gave him propaganda lectures. Pathet Lao General Khamkong and North Vietnamese Army General Tao, who speaks English, were the only high ranking officers to interview him. The North Vietnamese Army often displayed anger toward the prisoners because of the U.S. bombing in their area. DeBruin was allowed to eat his meals with, and talk to the other Americans but the villages had no knowledge whether he ever received letters or packages. DeBruin never escaped from Muong Phine or Muong Nong, because he was strictly guarded. In early January 1968 Ong Lui and six North Vietnamese Army soldiers took DeBruin and eight other Americans away. The villagers did not know Ong Lui's rank and said he was not from that area, but probably came from NVN to get the prisoners. The villagers were told only that DeBruin and the others were being taken away for training. End of report.

The case agent's superiors in the CIA disbelieved the report, as did the Defense Intelligence Agency.

DeBruin's brother, Jerome DeBruin, traveled to Laos in 1972 in search of information. Although the Pathet Lao admitted holding American prisoners of war, they insisted that the United States negotiate directly with them to ensure their release, but this never happened.

Eugene DeBruin in film
Eugene DeBruin was portrayed by Jeremy Davies in Werner Herzog's 2007 film Rescue Dawn. The film focuses mostly on Dieter Dengler's life as told to Herzog by Dengler himself, but has been severely criticized by members of the family of DeBruin and Indradat, the other survivor of the group, for portraying DeBruin as a selfish and unstable prisoner who threatened to betray his fellow prisoners at any time, and who, at the time of their escape, did not know what to do.

Herzog acknowledged that DeBruin acted heroically during his imprisonment, refusing to leave while some sick prisoners remained, but Herzog was unaware of this until after the film had been completed. Herzog states that this narrative aspect probably would have been included had he learned it earlier.

See also
List of people who disappeared

Notes

Textual reference
 Briggs, Thomas Leo (2009). Cash on Delivery: CIA Secret Operations During the Secret War in Laos. Rosebank Press, ISBNs 0-9841059-4-6, 978-0-9841059-4-6.

External links
Air America Association web site
Eugene DeBruin Biography
Air America  by Christopher Robbins
The Ravens, Pilots of the Secret War in Laos by Christopher Robbins

1933 births
1960s missing person cases
American military personnel killed in the Vietnam War
Missing people
Shot-down aviators
Vietnam War prisoners of war
United States Air Force airmen
University of Montana alumni
Laos–United States relations
United States Air Force personnel of the Vietnam War